Bixby is a surname. Notable people with the surname include:
 Anna Pierce Hobbs Bixby (1812–1873), American physician
 Bella Bixby (born 1995), American soccer player
 Bill Bixby (1934–1993), American actor and director
 Fanny Bixby (1879–1930), American philanthropist and activist better known as Fanny Bixby Spencer
 Francis M. Bixby (born 1828), New York politician
 Horace Ezra Bixby (1826–1912), steamboat pilot and captain, inventor, teacher of Mark Twain
 James Thompson Bixby (1843–1921), Unitarian minister and writer
 Jaydee Bixby (born 1990), Canadian country musician
 Jerome Bixby (1923–1998), American short story writer, editor and scriptwriter
 Jonathan Bixby (1959–2001), American costume designer
 Lenore E. Bixby (died 1994), American statistician
 Maynard Bixby (1853–1935), American mineralogist
 Moses Bixby (1827–1901), American pastor
 Norma Bixby (born 1941), member of the Montana House of Representatives (2000–present)
 Peter Bixby, member of the New Hampshire House of Representatives (2012–present)
 Robert Bixby (born 1955), executive director of the Concord Coalition
 Robert E. Bixby (born 1945), American mathematician
 Sarah Bixby (1871–1935), California writer better known as Sarah Bixby Smith
 Tams Bixby (1855–1922), American newspaper editor and publisher
 William Herbert Bixby (1849–1928), U.S. Army brigadier general and Chief of Engineers
 William K. Bixby (1857–1931), American art collector